(The Circle) was a Swiss gay magazine that was published from 1932 to 1967 and distributed internationally.

History

 was first published on January 1, 1932, under the original title  (Friendship Banner) as a joint project of Laura Thoma of Zürich lesbian organization Amicitia and August Bambula of the gay men's Excentric Club Zürich. The first issue was eight pages, credited editor "Fredy-Torrero" (Laura Thoma's alias) and proclaimed two related mottos: "Through light to freedom." and "Through struggle to victory". After a short pause it returned in 1933 under the changed title Schweizerisches Freundschaftsbanner.

The magazine originally focused on lesbian issues and was political in nature. Lesbianism was not criminalized in Switzerland at the time, unlike male homosexuality. From 1933 to 1942 it was published under the editorial leadership of Anna Vock who initially published under her real name, and later under the pen name "Mammina".

By 1942 most of the lesbian editorial staff had left and the magazine became exclusively focussed on gay male interests; the actor Karl Meier took over as the chief editor in 1942, using the pen name "Rolf", and renamed the magazine  (The Circle).

In 1942 the magazine's bimonthly circulation was around 200 copies, and by 1957 this had increased to 1,900, including 700 subscribers throughout Europe and the United States. It was the only gay magazine that continued publication through Nazi Germany and the only gay publication that was available in Europe during World War II.  was published in multiple languages: it was originally written in German, but a French section was added in 1942 and an English section in 1954. It contained news, short stories, poems, photographs, illustrations, and reports on scientific research. By and large, the magazine contained very little risqué content since Meier wanted to promote "a high-minded vision of homosexuality" that valued friendship over sex.

The magazine's leadership began to decline in the 1960s, since younger gay readers were more inclined to buy Scandinavian publications that published pornography and nude photographs, and the last issue was published in 1967.

The editors of  formed a society called , to which all readers were offered membership. The club held weekly meetings in Zürich, where readers gathered to meet other men, discuss current affairs, and listen to lectures hosted by the club; small meetings for French readers were also held in Paris.  hosted an international ball in Zürich each year which attracted hundreds of gay men from around Europe. The club disbanded in 1967 when the magazine ceased publication.

Legacy
Additionally, it remains the only gay publication to include editorial content in three languages.

In 2014, the magazine's history was documented in a Swiss docudrama film eponymously titled The Circle. The film, which features a mix of historical footage from the 1950s and dramatisations of events, won the Teddy Award and the Panorama Audience Award in the documentary category at the 64th Berlin International Film Festival.

References

External links
 .

20th century in LGBT history
1932 establishments in Switzerland
1967 disestablishments in Switzerland
Bi-monthly magazines published in Switzerland
Defunct magazines published in Switzerland
English-language magazines
French-language magazines
Gay men's magazines
German-language magazines
LGBT-related magazines
Magazines established in 1932
Magazines disestablished in 1967
Magazines published in Zürich